MNHS may refer to:

 Minnesota Historical Society

Schools 
 Mag-aba National High School, Pandan, Antique, Philippines
 Malinta National High School, Valenzuela City, Philippines
 Marple Newtown High School, Newtown Square, Pennsylvania, United States
 McKinney North High School, McKinney, Texas, United States
 Millard North High School, Omaha, Nebraska, United States
 Moonwalk National High School, Parañaque City, Philippines